A constitutional referendum was held in Palau on 14 July 1980. The Constitution of Palau, written after the Trust Territory's decision not to become one of the states of the Federated States of Micronesia in 1978, was approved by 81% of voters.

Results

References

1980 referendums
1980 in Palau
1980
1980